The women's 50 metre freestyle swimming events for the 2016 Summer Paralympics take place at the Rio Olympic Stadium from 8 to 15 September. A total of ten events are contested for ten different classifications.

Competition format
Each event consists of two rounds: heats and final. The top eight swimmers overall in the heats progress to the final. If there are eight or fewer swimmers in an event, no heats are held and all swimmers qualify for the final.

Results

S4

18:33 17 September 2016:

S5

20:35 12 September 2016:

S6

17:50 10 September 2016:

S7

18:05 9 September 2016:

S8

18:03 11 September 2016

S9

19:55 13 September 2016:

S10

18:35 9 September 2016:

S11

18:15 12 September 2016:

S12

18:06 17 September 2016:

S13

19:52 14 September 2016:

References

Swimming at the 2016 Summer Paralympics